Emma Friis (born 31 October 1999) is a Danish handball player who plays for Herning-Ikast Håndbold and the Danish national team.

She made her debut on the Danish national team on 29 September 2018, against Norway.

In September 2018, she was included by EHF in a list of the twenty best young handballers to watch for the future.

She represented Denmark at the 2021 World Women's Handball Championship in Spain.

Individual awards  
 All-Star Left Wing of the European Championship: 2022
 All-Star Left Wing of the IHF Junior World Championship: 2018
 All-Star Left Wing of the IHF Youth World Championship: 2016
 Youth player of the Year in Damehåndboldligaen: 2018/19

References

1999 births
Living people
People from Herning Municipality
Danish female handball players
Sportspeople from the Central Denmark Region